The Lindsey Creek Tree was the largest single-stem organism (tree) known to have existed historically. It was a coast redwood (also known as California redwood), a member of the species Sequoia sempervirens. It grew in Fieldbrook, California, along the Lindsey Creek, which feeds into the Mad River. There are no known photographs of the tree. 

When it was uprooted and felled by a storm in 1905, its mass and dimensions were estimated, with a  weight of at least 3,630 short tons, 3.3 million kilograms, or 7.26 million pounds and trunk volume of at least 2,550 cubic meters (90,000 cubic feet). 

If these estimates were correct, this would have made it close to twice the size (in volume) of the largest living single-stem tree, the giant sequoia known as General Sherman; nearly triple that of the largest living coast redwood, Grogan's Fault, and having a trunk volume five times larger than the tallest of its species existing today, the Hyperion, only ten feet shorter at 380.1 feet.

Johnson claims
Skip Johnson, a Fieldbrook logger interviewed in 1971, testified that he witnessed the Lindsey Creek Tree after it had fallen. He reported it as the tallest tree in Fieldbrook.

See also
List of superlative trees
List of individual trees

References

Further reading

Walter Fry and John Roberts White. Big Trees. Stanford, Calif., Stanford University Press; London, Humphrey Milford, Oxford University Press; First Printing, 1930, xvi, 126 pp.; ill.; 22.2 cm. x 14.4 cm.
 Donald Culross Peattie. A Natural History of Western Trees. Boston, Houghton Mifflin Company, 1950. .

External links
Interesting Tree Facts, United Nations Environment Programme

History of Humboldt County, California
Individual coast redwood trees
1900s individual tree deaths